Satu Untuk Berbagi is the fourth album by Gugun Blues Shelter. The album actually the band's double release. This released album officially only distributed in Indonesia. For United States and the European market, a few months later they released Solid Ground, where they use Gugun Power Trio name.

Satu Untuk Berbagi topped a list published by Rolling Stone Indonesia as the best studio album released in 2011.

Track listing
All song written and composed by Gugun Blues Shelter.

Personnel
 Gugun - Lead Guitar and Lead Vocals
 Jono Armstrong - Bass guitar
 Bowie - Drums

References

External links 
 Official Site

2011 albums
Gugun Blues Shelter albums